Elly & Jools is an Australian children's television series that originally aired on the Nine Network in 1990. It starred Rebecca Smart as Elinor 'Elly' Lockett and Clayton Williamson as Julian 'Jools' Trevaller. It also featured Abigail, Anne Tenney, Peter Fisher, Dennis Miller, Damon Herriman and Vanessa Collier. It was filmed at Peninsula House in Windsor, New South Wales and at the Australiana Pioneer Village in Wilberforce.

The dog which appeared in the series also played the dingo in the Meryl Streep and Sam Neill film, A Cry in the Dark.

Plot synopsis
The Trevaller family move from the city to a new house in a small country town called Waterloo Creek – a town full of weird and wonderful characters. The house they move into is haunted by the ghost of Elly, a young girl. Elly befriends the Trevaller's son Jools, who tries to help solve the mystery of her murder. In the final episode it is revealed that Elly was never murdered but had died in a tragic accident and stayed in the world of the living in order to clear the name of the man suspected of her murder. Finally having achieved her peace she passes to the afterlife and is reunited with her loving family whilst Jools meets Eloise, a living girl identical to Elly who is perceived either as her reincarnation or as a sign to him that the world is full of human girls just like her.

See also
List of ghost films

References

External links
 Elly and Jools at the Australian Television Information Archive.

Australian children's television series
1990 Australian television series debuts
1990 Australian television series endings
Television series by Endemol Australia
Television series about ghosts